Franz Albert Bischoff (January 14, 1864 – February 5, 1929) was an American artist known primarily for his China painting, floral paintings and California landscapes. He was born in Steinschönau, Austria (now known as Kamenický Šenov, Czech Republic).  He immigrated to the United States as a teenager where he became a naturalized citizen. While in Europe, his early training was focused upon applied design, watercolor and ceramic decorations.

California years 

After arriving in the United States, Bischoff worked in New York, Fostoria, Ohio, Detroit, Michigan, and Dearborn, Michigan. While in Detroit and Dearborn, he gained success as a porcelain painter, and as a teacher of the techniques, as well as a manufacturer of ceramic glazes as well as a teacher of watercolor painting.

Franz Bischoff decided to visit California in 1900 and ultimately chose to settle in the Los Angeles area in 1906. Shortly after arriving, he started making arrangements to design and build a large Italian Renaissance style home in Pasadena that also became his studio. This landmark home was completed in 1908.

Bischoff was one of the earliest members of the California Art Club, and the group's second meeting was held at his studio on February 5, 1910. Also present at that meeting were Carl Oscar Borg and William Wendt.

Inspired by the California countryside, Bischoff attempted to capture the area's brilliant light and diverse landscapes. Spending less time with ceramic painting following the start of World War I, Bischoff took up canvas painting. He painted local farms, fishing wharfs, coastal landscapes and scenes of the Sierra Nevada and the mountains of Utah, including Zion National Park.  Recognized during his career for use of color and vivid composition, his paintings always displayed reverence for nature. One critic commented that some of his later works flirted with Expressionism and his use of colors were reminiscent of Fauvism. Franz Bischoff died of heart failure at home in his adopted city of South Pasadena, California, on February 5, 1929.

Selected paintings

Awards 
 Huntington Prize, California Art Club, 1924

Exhibitions 
Nov. 21,2010 - Mar 20, 2011: Gardens and Grandeur: Porcelains and Paintings by Franz A. Bischoff, Pasadena Museum of California Art

Galleries & public collections 
Franz Bischoff Gallery of Art
 Laguna Beach Museum of Art, Laguna Beach, California
 Irvine Museum, Irvine, California
 Gardena High School, Gardena, California
 The Oakland Museum, California
  Crocker Art Museum, Sacramento, California
 William A. Karges Fine Art

Further reading 
 Edan Milton Hughes, Artists in California, 1786-1940, 3rd Edition, 2002 
 Ruth Lily Westphal, Plein Air Painters of California (The Southland), Westphal Publishing 1982

External links
Franz Bischoff Artist and Gallery web site

References

1864 births
1929 deaths
People from Kamenický Šenov
People from the Kingdom of Bohemia
German Bohemian people
Austro-Hungarian emigrants to the United States
American people of German Bohemian descent
19th-century American painters
American male painters
20th-century American painters
American landscape painters
19th-century American male artists
20th-century American male artists